Anne-Marie Comeau (born 1 June 1996) is a Canadian cross-country skier. She competed in the women's 15 kilometre skiathlon at the 2018 Winter Olympics where she finished 48th.
She competed for Canada at the FIS Nordic World Ski Championships 2017 in Lahti, Finland. She is also a cross-country & Marathon runner.

Cross-country skiing results
All results are sourced from the International Ski Federation (FIS).

Olympic Games

World Cup

Season standings

Running personal bests
*Done on "time trials", time trials are unofficial maximal efforts that are done solo or in a group. These are not "real races".

References

External links
 

1996 births
Living people
Canadian female cross-country skiers
Olympic cross-country skiers of Canada
Cross-country skiers at the 2018 Winter Olympics
Skiers from Quebec City
Laval Rouge et Or athletes
21st-century Canadian women